Onesidezero is the second studio album by Onesidezero, released on June 5, 2007.

This album was released almost six years after their major label debut Is This Room Getting Smaller.

Track listing

Personnel
Onesidezero:
 Jasan Radford — vocals
 Levon Sultanian — guitars, backing vocals 
 Cristian Hernandez — bass, backing vocals
 Rob Basile — drums

References

2007 albums
Onesidezero albums
Corporate Punishment Records albums
Albums produced by Ulrich Wild